Don Fullmer (February 21, 1939 – January 28, 2012) was an American professional boxer and  a brother of the former world middleweight champion Gene Fullmer. Eight years younger than his more famous brother, Don followed Gene into the gym in West Jordan, Utah, to learn how to box. He fought as an amateur for four years and did not lose in sixty-five fights. Another brother, Jay, was also active in boxing.

Boxing career
Don turned professional in 1957 as a middleweight and beat some top contenders during his early career, such as Rocky Fumerelle, Rocky Rivero, and Joe DeNucci. However, he also lost to some good fighters, such as former champions Terry Downes, Dick Tiger, José Torres and Emile Griffith, as well as Joey Archer.  

In 1964 he beat Jimmy Ellis, who later went on to win the World Boxing Association version of the heavyweight championship. The win against Ellis began a winning streak for Fullmer and he went on to defeat  Griffith and Archer in rematches. This streak ended when he lost to Nino Benvenuti in Rome in 1966. Benvenuti went on to win the middleweight title, and after Fullmer beat Carl "Bobo" Olson he fought a rematch with Benvenuti for the title in 1968. He knocked the Italian down but lost a fifteen-round unanimous decision. While never a recognized world champion, Fullmer did win a bout billed as for the "World Junior Light Heavyweight Championship" when he defeated Joe Hopkins in 1967. This title was the precursor to the current super middleweight championship. Few in the boxing world recognized the legitimacy of that title.

Fullmer retired from the ring in 1973. In his retirement, he worked for the Salt Lake County Fire Department. Along with his brothers, he ran the Fullmer Brothers boxing gym in West Jordan. The gym provided for kids to work out for free.

Death
Don Fullmer died of leukemia on January 28, 2012, aged 72. He and his wife, Nedra, had five sons.

Filmography
The Devil's Brigade (1968) - The G.I.

Professional boxing record

References

External links

 
 Fullmer Brothers Boxing website

1939 births
2012 deaths
Middleweight boxers
Boxers from Utah
People from West Jordan, Utah
Deaths from leukemia
Deaths from cancer in Utah
American male boxers